Praveen Gandhi is an Indian film director, and actor known for his works in Tamil cinema.

Career
Praveen Gandhi was first given the opportunity to become a film maker by producer K. T. Kunjumon with Ratchagan (1997), who noted that in the director he saw "a young man who is very talented and full of ideas who was willing to work hard". The film was launched in January 1996 but filming only commenced the following year in January 1997, with an established cast and crew including Telugu actor Nagarjuna, Miss Universe pageant winner Sushmita Sen, Girish Karnad and A. R. Rahman. The film was shot all over India including locations in Manali, Mumbai, Goa, Ooty, Rajasthan and Delhi, with Kunjumon making a claim during filming stages that the film would become India's most costly production.

Praveen Gandhi returned in 1999 with the romantic film, Jodi, featuring Prashanth and Simran. He released the film under the name Praveenkanth, his original name, after being known as Praveen Gandhi in his first venture. The director also played a cameo role in the film portraying an eloping youngster who assists Prashanth. The film opened to positive reviews and became a box office success, with a reviewer noting "the director's light-veined screenplay keeps the movie moving at a good pace".

In 2000, Praveen Gandhi considered making a film titled Apoorvan with Ajith Kumar and Aishwarya Rai starring, but the project did not materialise. Jodi'''s success prompted director to collaborate with Prashanth and Simran again in a project called Star (2001), but Simran soon dropped out and the film failed to replicate the success of Jodi. Portraying a full length supporting role, Praveen Gandhi won negative reviews for his acting and direction with a critic noting it was a "ruinously shoddy script" and "the director’s attempt to enter into the acting arena, and play one of the crucial characters in the film adds insult to injury". Another reviewer described that "the messy screenplay in the second half ruins the story that admittedly has enough potential for romance, laughs, sentiments and action".

In 2003, he began working on a film titled Thullal, in which he would play the central character and despite being launched amidst much fanfare, its theatrical release saw a delay. The film eventually opened in July 2007 to unanimously poor reviews, with a critic labelling the film as "torture", adding that the director has a "misplaced sense of self importance in his very first film as a hero". Despite the failure of the film, he announced two further acting ventures Muktha then Vilasam TN 03 6999, though neither film were completed or released. Another directorial venture planned in 2009, Adayalam'' with Ragini, also failed to materialize.

Filmography

References

Living people
Tamil film directors
Male actors in Tamil cinema
20th-century Indian film directors
Indian male film actors
1974 births